Gujranwala Division is an administrative division of Punjab province, Pakistan. The division, headquartered at the city of Gujranwala, consist of 6 districts, covers an area of 17,207 km2. According to the 1981 census, the population was 7,522,352, and rose by almost 4 million to 11,431,058 according to the 1998 census.

Districts

It consists of the following districts:

Demographics 
According to 2017 census, Gujranwala division had a population of 16,123,984, which includes 7,985,444 males and 8,133,618 females. 
Gujranwala division constitutes 15,693,647 Muslims, 389,011 Christians, 32,844 Ahmadi followed 3,665 Hindus, 674 scheduled castes and 1,020 others.

See also 
 Divisions of Pakistan
 Divisions of Punjab, Pakistan

References

External links 
 Photographer In Gujranwala

Divisions of Punjab, Pakistan